Asurkot is a village in Arghakhanchi District in Lumbini Province of western Nepal. At the time of the 1991 Nepal census, the village had a population of 2500 living in 434 houses. At the time of the 2001 Nepal census, the population was 2464, of which 58% was literate. The village is farwest village of Arghakhanchi district.

References

Populated places in Arghakhanchi District